Kethlun "Keth" Warder is a co-protagonist of the fantasy novel Shatterglass, by Tamora Pierce. He is a glass artisan native to Namorn, and throughout the novel becomes a student of weather-mage Trisana Chandler, despite the fact that at fourteen, she is six years his junior.

Character Biography
Born to a Namornese family in the glass-crafting business, Keth was trained in glassblowing and the other arts of making glass from a young age, and progressed swiftly, aided by "a spark" of magic attuned to glass-work. He was betrothed and qualified as a journeyman. 

When walking on the shore of the Syth, Keth was caught in a thunderstorm and struck by lightning. The injury caused him to become paralyzed. Through rehabilitation, he eventually regained most of his capabilities, although symptoms like tremors and a permanently slurred speech. 

The injury caused Keth, previously an up-and-coming glass-worker, to become a burden on his family business. When he feared that the glass-workers' guild would take away his journeyman status, he chose instead to travel to Tharios, where his fourth cousin Antonou Tinos kept a glass workshop. In Tharios, Keth lived in a rented room in Khapik, the city-state's pleasure district, where the Tharian entertainers known as yaskedasi live and work. 

His stay in Khapik caused him to cross paths with the Ghost, a serial killer who operated in Khapik, murdering only female yaskedasi. When the Ghost killed his neighbor, a dancer named Iralima, Keth helped care for her orphaned daughter, Glaki. 

Though he was working at regaining his skill, Keth was unaware of one of the side-effects of the lightning strike that first debilitated him. Along with the physiological damage, the lightning turned Keth's seed of glass magic into a mixture of glass and lightning magic. The change in his abilities as a mage passed Keth by until it was discovered by a traveling mage, Trisana Chandler, when she saw him at the center of a large, accidental magical working; Keth was attempting to create a glass vase, when his untrained magic drew in spells from all around the neighborhood, which mixed with the glass and a seed of lightning to create a living creature, a dragon made of glass, with lightning blood. 

Enraged and frustrated by his lack of control over his own craft, Keth attempted to destroy the dragon. Tris, who was berating him for unraveling the spells of others in his magical working, intervened on behalf of the dragon, citing the mages' ethical code that states that a living creature, however accidentally created, should not be killed. She adopted the dragon, naming it "Chime". Once she found that Keth was a newly discovered, untrained mage, the same ethical code forced her to find him a teacher. Because of the lightning mixed into his magic, no glass-mage in Tharios was willing to teach him, and the job fell to the ranking lightning-mage, Tris herself. 

The learning experience proved difficult both to Tris, a naturally temperamental person who'd never had a student before, and to Keth, who was dismayed at being taught the basics of magic by a teacher younger than himself. Through meditation, Keth gradually gained some control of his magic, although glassblowing proved most difficult for him to remaster. His first deliberate magical working was a globe of glass lined from within with lightning which, when it cleared, proved to contain a replica of the scene of the Ghost's latest murder. 

His unintentional knowledge of the Ghost's murders caused both Keth and Tris to fall under the suspicion of the arurim, Tharios's law enforcement. Once Tris succeeded in releasing him from their suspicions, Keth, who was emotionally invested in the case because of the death of his neighbor, began collaborating with Dema Nomasdina, the officer in charge of the investigation. He continually attempted to replicate the glass and lightning globe, hoping to find the scene of the next murder before it took place. Though he eventually managed to create another globe, it was only after the fact, and failed to prevent the murder. 

Keth continued to create lightning globes containing the scenes of each of the Ghost's murders, each one closer and closer to the time of the victim's death. One of the victims was another of his neighbors, Glaki's foster-mother Yali, with whom he was romantically interested. After Yali's murders, Keth increased his efforts, while the arurim set up an undercover guard in Khapik, hoping to catch the Ghost in the act. With their combined efforts, a murder-in-progress was finally discovered and stopped, although the Ghost escaped. 

It was Tris who eventually caught him, and when Keth followed her, the Ghost was trapped to his thighs in the earth, and Tris was debating whether or not to kill him. Against Tris's former teacher, Niklaren Goldeye, Keth argued for Tris to kill the Ghost, on grounds that he was a murderer and deserved to die. Tris, however, decided against it. 

When Tris, Niko and Glaki left Tharios to travel north to Emelan, Keth remained in Tharios, expressing an interest in using his magic for forensics, despite his earlier statement that he'd become a glass-maker in order to create pretty things, not ugly ones.

See also

 Shatterglass
 The Circle Opens
 Trisana Chandler

Warder, Kethlun